"Fear Is Not My Future" is a song performed by American contemporary worship collective Maverick City Music and American gospel musician Kirk Franklin featuring American singers Brandon Lake and Chandler Moore. The radio version of the song was released on November 4, 2022, becoming the lead single from their collaborative live album, Kingdom Book One (2022). Brandon Lake had originally released the song featuring Chandler Moore on his third studio album, Help! (2022). The song was written by Brandon Lake, Hannah Shackelford, Jonathan Jay, and Nicole Hannel.

"Fear Is Not My Future" debuted at number 13 on the US Hot Christian Songs chart, and at number four on the Hot Gospel Songs chart. The song received a nomination for the Grammy Award for Best Contemporary Christian Music Performance/Song at the 2023 Grammy Awards.

Background
Brandon Lake originally released "Fear Is Not My Future" with Chandler Moore as the eighth track on his third studio album, Help!, on May 13, 2022. Lake shared the story behind the song, saying:

On June 17. 2022, Maverick City Music and Kirk Franklin released the live version of the song featuring Lake and Moore as the second track on their collaborative live album, Kingdom Book One, along with the song's official music video.

Composition

Reception

Critical response
Katie Cline of Air1 gave a favorable opinion of the song, saying: "In “Fear is Not My Future,” Brandon Lake and Chandler David Moore’s voices restore hope to our troubled minds, bidding farewell to sickness, heartbreak, and death as we embrace the peace, love, and joy of Christ in our lives." Briauna Prieto of Peer Magazine wrote a positive review of the song, saying: "With a typical build and repetitive lyrics, this song is easy to catch on to. It's also full of long musical interludes that Maverick City incorporates into so many of their songs, giving plenty of room to have your own personal reflection during the song."

Awards and nominations

Commercial performance
"Fear Is Not My Future" debuted at number 26 on the US Hot Christian Songs chart, and number 11 on the Hot Gospel Songs chart dated July 2, 2022.

Music videos
On June 17, 2022, Maverick City Music and Kirk Franklin released the music video of "Fear Is Not My Future" featuring Brandon Lake and Chandler Moore, filmed at Mother Emmanuel AME Church in Charleston, South Carolina. The music video's release is in remembrance of the Charleston church shooting which occurred at the church seven years prior on June 17, 2015.

On June 20, 2022, Essential Worship released an acoustic performance video of the song, with Brandon Lake and Chandler Moore leading the song.

Charts

Weekly charts

Year-end charts

Release history

Other versions
 Todd Galberth released his own rendition of "Fear Is Not My Future" which featured Tasha Cobbs Leonard on his album, Encounter (2022).

References

External links
 
 

2022 songs
Maverick City Music songs
Kirk Franklin songs
Brandon Lake songs
Chandler Moore songs
Songs written by Brandon Lake
RCA Records singles